Abner Eliezer Shimony (March 10, 1928 – August 8, 2015) was an American physicist and philosopher. He specialized in quantum theory and philosophy of science. As a physicist, he concentrated on the interaction between relativity theory and quantum mechanics. He authored many works and research on complementarity in quantum entanglement as well as multiparticle quantum interferometry, both relating to quantum coherence.  He authored research articles and books on the foundations of quantum mechanics. He received the 1996 Lakatos Prize for his work in philosophy of science.

Education
Shimony was born in Columbus, Ohio.  He obtained his BA in Mathematics and Philosophy from Yale University in 1948, and an MA in Philosophy from the University of Chicago in 1950. He obtained his Ph.D. in philosophy from Yale University in 1953 under the supervision of Rudolf Carnap, and served in the U.S. Army Signal Corps from 1953 to 1955. Shimony acquired his second doctorate in physics from Princeton University in 1962 under the supervision of Eugene Wigner with a thesis titled Regression and Response in Thermodynamic Systems.

Career
After receiving his second Ph.D., Shimony interacted with both the philosophical academic world and the physics academic world. His most famous professional correspondence is with Rudolf Carnap. He taught philosophy of science at MIT from 1959 until 1968 in the school’s Department of Humanities. In 1968 he transferred to Boston University, beginning a 26-year appointment in both the physics and philosophy departments, and was Professor Emeritus there until his death in 2015. Shimony is best known for his work in developing the CHSH inequality, an empirically testable form of the Bell inequality, also known as Bell's theorem. Since 1992, he proposed a geometric measure of quantum entanglement and, along with Gregg Jaeger and Michael Horne, discovered two novel complementarity relations involving interferometric visibility in multiparticle quantum interferometry.
 
He is also known for his inquiry into the question of the "peaceful coexistence" of quantum mechanics and special relativity.  He wrote several books and numerous research articles on the foundations of quantum mechanics and related topics.  Shimony is credited with coining the phrase "passion at a distance" to characterize the various phenomena described by quantum correlations in 1984.

In 1996 he was awarded the Lakatos Award in the philosophy of science for
the two-volume collection of papers, The Search for a Naturalistic World View, spanning his career up until 1992. He served as president of the Philosophy of Science Association from 1995 to 1996.  He died in New Haven, Connecticut, aged 87.

Shimony was married to the noted anthropologist Annemarie Anrod Shimony., from 1951 until her death in 1995.

Selected publications
Primary
 1987. Edited by Abner Shimony & Debra Nails; Naturalistic Epistemology: A Symposium of Two Decades (Boston Studies in the Philosophy of Science Volume 100) 
 1993. Selected Papers, Search for a Naturalistic World View, Volume 1, Scientific Method and Epistemology 
 1993. Selected Papers, Search for a Naturalistic World View, Volume 2, Natural Science and Metaphysics 
 1998, Tibaldo and the Hole in the Calendar 

Secondary
 1977. Edited by Abner Shimony; Rudolf Carnap; Two Essays on Entropy 
 1997. Edited by Robert S. Cohen, Michael Horne & John Stachel; Experimental Metaphysics: Quantum Mechanical Studies for Abner Shimony, Volume 1 (Boston Studies in the Philosophy of Science Volume 193) 
 1997. Edited by Robert S. Cohen, Michael Horne & John Stachel; Potentiality, Entanglement and Passion-at-a-Distance: Quantum Mechanical Studies for Abner Shimony, Volume 2 (Boston Studies in the Philosophy of Science Volume 194) 
 1997. Edited by Malcolm Longair; Roger Penrose with Abner Shimony, Nancy Cartwright and Stephen Hawking; The Large, the Small and the Human Mind 
 2006. Edited by Abner Shimony; Martin Eger; Science, Understanding, and Justice: Philosophical Essays 
 2009. Edited by Wayne C. Myrvold & Joy Christian; Quantum Reality, Relativistic Causality, and Closing the Epistemic Circle: Essays in Honour of Abner Shimony

See also
 Englert–Greenberger duality relation
 Epistemological Letters

References

External links
 Shimony's article on Bell's theorem in the Stanford Encyclopedia of Philosophy.
 Partial bibliography of philosophical papers.
 Boston University Faculty page for Abner Shimony.
 Photo of Abner Shimony during his career at BU.
 Transcript of Oral History interview with Abner Shimony, September 9, 2002, American Institute of Physics, Niels Bohr Library and Archives.
 A recent conference held at the Perimeter Institute in honor of Abner Shimony Quantum Reality, Relativistic Causality, and Closing the Epistemic Circle: An International Conference in Honour of Abner Shimony | Perimeter Institute 
 Shimony conference talks at the Perimeter Institute Quantum Reality, Relativistic Causality, and Closing the Epistemic Circle – 2006 | PIRSA
Shimony Papers Guide to the Abner Shimony Papers, 1947–2009 ASP.2009.02 | Digital Pitt (Abner Shimony Papers, 1947–2009, ASP.2009.02, Archives of Scientific Philosophy, Special Collections Department, University of Pittsburgh)
 An Abner Shimony retrospective (from Mind and Matter) In Appreciation of Abner Shimony
 Former PhD Students
Ronald Anderson (Boston College)
Joy Christian (University of Oxford)
John H. Heffner (Lebanon Valley College)
Michael Horne  (Stonehill College)
Don Howard (University of Notre Dame)
Gregg Jaeger (Boston University)
Andre Mirabelli
Wayne Myrvold (University of W. Ontario)
Paul Teller (UC Davis)
 Shimony's last presentation, "Reminiscences", at the Boston Colloquium in the Philosophy of Science, at their 50th anniversary celebration, October 22, 2010
Full conference
Video of Shimony presentation
Powerpoint of Shimony presentation
PDF of Shimony presentation

1928 births
2015 deaths
American physicists
Jewish American scientists
Jewish philosophers
People from Columbus, Ohio
Philosophers of science
Princeton University alumni
Quantum physicists
Yale University alumni
Lakatos Award winners
21st-century American Jews
American philosophers
Massachusetts Institute of Technology faculty
Boston University faculty
University of Chicago alumni
Fellows of the American Physical Society